Ariyankuppam River is a distributary of Sankaraparani River. It branches off Sankaraparani near Thirukanchi. Due to property development, its origin was cut off. Thengaithittu Langoon is found in this river. Arikamedu is the major tourist spot in the river. Ariyankuppam River drains into Bay of Bengal at Puducherry Fishing Harbour.

See also 
 List of rivers of Puducherry

References

 
Rivers of Puducherry
Rivers of India